Frieseomelitta silvestrii is a stingless bees species in the genus Frieseomelitta found in Brazil.

Frieseomelitta silvestrii languida is a subspecies making use of resin and of the chemical compound totarol.

References

Meliponini
Hymenoptera of South America
Hymenoptera of Brazil